Turn It Off may refer to:

"Turn It Off", a 2011 song by Elder McKinley from the musical The Book of Mormon
"Turn It Off", a 2009 song by Paramore from the album Brand New Eyes
"Turn It Off", a 2017 song by Why Don't We
"Turn It Off", a 2011 song by the Wanted from the album Battleground